Proto-Iranian or Proto-Iranic is the reconstructed proto-language of the Iranian languages branch of Indo-European language family and thus the ancestor of the Iranian languages such as Pashto, Persian, Sogdian, Zazaki, Ossetian, Mazandarani, Kurdish, Talysh and others. Its speakers, the hypothetical Proto-Iranians, are assumed to have lived in the 2nd millennium BC and are usually connected with the Andronovo archaeological horizon (see Indo-Iranians).

Proto-Iranian was a satem language descended from the Proto-Indo-Iranian language, which in turn, came from the Proto-Indo-European language. It was likely removed less than a millennium from the Avestan language, and less than two millennia from Proto-Indo-European.

Dialects 
Skjærvø postulates that there were at least four dialects that initially developed out of Proto-Iranian, two of which are attested by texts:

 Old Northwest Iranian (unattested, ancestor of Ossetian)
 Old Northeast Iranian (unattested, ancestor of Middle Iranian Khotanese and modern Wakhi)
 Old Central Iranian (attested, includes Avestan and Median, ancestor of most modern Iranian languages)
 Old Southwest Iranian (attested, includes Old Persian, ancestor of modern Persian)

Note that different terminology is used for the modern languages: Ossetian has often been classified as a "Northeast Iranian" language, while "Northwest Iranian" usually refers to languages to the northwest of Persian, such as Zaza or the Caspian languages.

Phonological correspondences

Development into Old Iranian 
The term Old Iranian refers to the stage in Iranian history represented by the earliest written languages: Avestan and Old Persian. These two languages are usually considered to belong to different main branches of Iranian, and many of their similarities are found also in the other Iranian languages. Regardless, there are many arguments that many of these Old Iranian features may not have occurred yet in Proto-Iranian, and they may have instead spread across an Old Iranian dialect continuum already separated in dialects (see Wave theory). Additionally, most Iranian languages cannot be derived from either attested Old Iranian language: numerous unwritten Old Iranian dialects must have existed, whose descendants surface in the written record only later.

 Vocalization of laryngeals
The Proto-Indo-European laryngeal consonants are likely to have been retained quite late in the Indo-Iranian languages in at least some positions.

 *l > *r
This change is found widely across the Iranian languages, indeed Indo-Iranian as a whole: it appears also in Vedic Sanskrit. Avestan has no **/l/ phoneme at all. Regardless many words, for which the other Indo-European languages indicate original *l, still show /l/ in several Iranian languages, including New Persian, Kurdish and Zazaki. These include e.g. Persian lab 'lip', līz- 'to lick', gulū 'throat' (compare e.g. Latin ); Zazaki lü 'fox' (compare e.g. Latin ). This preservation is however not systematic, and likely has been mostly diminished through interdialectal loaning of r-forms, and in some cases extended by the loaning of words from smaller western Iranian languages into Persian.

 *s > *h
This change occurs in all Iranian languages, but is regardless sometimes thought to be later than Proto-Iranian, based on the Old Persian name Huša, thought to refer to Susa.

Aspirated stops
The Proto-Indo-Iranian aspirated stops *pʰ, *tʰ and *kʰ were spirantized into *f, *θ and *x in most Iranian languages. However, they appear to be retained in Parachi, varieties of Kurdish, and the Saka languages (Khotanese, Tumshuqese and Wakhi); and to have merged with the voiceless aspirated stops in Balochi. In the case of Saka, secondary influence from Gāndhārī Prakrit is likely.

 *c, *dz > *s, *z
The Proto-Indo-European palatovelars *ḱ, *ǵ (and *ǵʰ) were fronted to affricates *ć, *dź in Proto-Indo-Iranian (the affricate stage being preserved in the Nuristani languages). The development in the Old Iranian period shows divergences: Avestan, as also most newer Iranian languages, show /s/ and /z/, while Old Persian shows /θ/ and /d/. (Word-initially, the former develops also into /s/ by Middle Persian.) — The change *c > *s must be also newer than the development *s > *h, since this new *s was not affected by the previous change.

 *cw > *sp
This change also clearly fails to apply to all Iranian languages. Old Persian with its descendants shows /s/, possibly likewise Kurdish and Balochi. The Saka languages show /š/. All other Iranian languages have /sp/, or a further descendant (e.g. /fs/ in Ossetian).

 *θr > *c
This change is typical for Old Persian and its descendants, as opposed to Avestan and most languages first attested in the Middle or New Iranian periods. Kurdish and Balochi may again have shared this change as well.

References

Further reading 

Iranian languages
Iranian